Mobilità di Marca S.p.A. (MOM) is the unique public transportation company based on buses in the Province of Treviso, working since December 30, 2011.

History
In 2008, the Province of Treviso, as a financial corporation for local public transportation, launched the merging project for the four companies which worked as far as that sector was concerned, that is to say ACTT, La Marca, CTM and ATM.

MOM was officially founded on December 30, 2011 and a technical period was tested until December 31, 2013 to redesign workers' contracts, transport lines and a single tariff plan, in order to create a big economical society.

Network
MOM runs the following services (incidentally, the original company):

Urban services
 Treviso (ACTT: 13 lines)
Conegliano (ATM: 6 lines)
Vittorio Veneto (ATM: 6 lines)
Montebelluna (La Marca: 4 lines)
Asolo (CTM: 1 line)

Suburban and out-of-town services:
Castelfranco Veneto and the piedmont area (CTM & La Marca)
Conegliano and Vittorio Veneto (ATM)
Oderzo (La Marca)
Other areas (La Marca & CTM)

Airport connections
"Canova" Airport in Treviso (ACTT & La Marca)
"Marco Polo" Airport in Venice (ACTT with ATVO)

Conegliano Urban Service

41 Via XXIV Maggio-Crevada
42 Via Matteotti-Via dei Mille
43 Via San Giuseppe-Bagnolo
44 Conegliano-Ogliano
45 Conegliano-Nostra Famiglia

Montebelluna Urban Service

81 Montebelluna-Busta-Montebelluna
82 Montebelluna-Busta-San Gaetano-Montebelluna
83 Montebelluna-Sant'Andrea-San Gaetano-Montebelluna
84 Montebelluna-Via Castellana-Sant'Andrea-Montebelluna

Vittorio Veneto Urban Service 

31 Ospedale-Vittorio Veneto-Longhere
32 Sant'Apollonia-Vittorio Veneto-Santi Pietro e Paolo
33 Vittorio Veneto-Carpesica
34 Vittorio Veneto-San Giacomo
35 Vittorio Veneto-Ponte Maset
36 Vittorio Veneto-Fais

Treviso Urban Service

1 Ospedale-Stazione FS-Piazza Matteotti-Santa Maria del Rovere-Sant'Artemio-Carità-Catena-Villorba
3 Stazione FS-Fiera-Silea-Lanzago-Cendon-Sant'Elena
4 Casier-Sant'Antonino-Stazione FS-Fontane-Carità
6 Stazione FS-Piazza Duomo-San Giuseppe-Aeroporto-Quinto di Treviso
7 Sant'Artemio-Stadio-Piazza Matteotti-Stazione FS-San Lazzaro-San Zeno
8 Piazza Vittoria-Stazione FS-San Lazzaro-Frescada-San Trovaso-Sambughè
8E Treviso FS-Preganziol-Mogliano-Mestre-Venezia (jointly operated with ACTV)
9 San Paolo-San Liberale-Piazza Pio X-Stazione FS-Dosson-Conscio/Preganziol
10 Treviso FS-Carbonera-Pezzan-Mignagola
11 Padernello-Paese-Piazzale Pistoia-Treviso FS
12 Carità-San Sisto-Catena-Castrette-Carità
21Castagnola-Paese-Piazzale Papà Pio X-Treviso FS
55 Quinto di Treviso-Canizzano-Sant'Angelo-San Zeno-Treviso FS-San Bona-Merlengo
61 Treviso FS-San Pelajo-Ponzano-Paderno)Sant'Antonio/Barrucchella Camarò
SCO (dedicated school services for students of schools in Treviso)

See also 
Treviso
Province of Treviso

External links 
 Official Website (in Italian)

Province of Treviso
Transport in Veneto